"New Disease" is a single by the American industrial metal band Spineshank. The song appears on the band's second album The Height of Callousness and was included on the soundtrack for the video game Shaun Palmer's Pro Snowboarder and MX Superfly. The song was also featured on the soundtrack of the film 3000 Miles to Graceland.

Music video
The video includes the band in the room singing and playing, a man fixing a CCTV camera which the band are looking at and the lead singer talking to a girl who is sitting down alone. The video later reveals that a boy, the girl and the person fixing the camera are floating. After the second chorus, the clouds become darker and the man fixing the CCTV camera falls, the light in the room that the band is in fades, and everybody but the band start falling to the ground.

Track listing

Charts

References 

Spineshank songs
2000 songs
2000 singles
Roadrunner Records singles
Song recordings produced by Garth Richardson